Marian Kolasa (born 12 August 1959 in Gdańsk, Pomorskie) is a retired Polish pole vaulter. He won two medals at the European Indoor Championships. His personal best was 5.80 metres, achieved in September 1986 in Kamp-Lintfort. He is the older brother of fellow pole vaulters, Ryszard and Adam.

International competitions

1No mark in the final

References

sports-reference

1959 births
Living people
Polish male pole vaulters
Athletes (track and field) at the 1988 Summer Olympics
Olympic athletes of Poland
Sportspeople from Gdańsk
Lechia Gdańsk athletes